A Werner state is a -dimensional bipartite quantum state density matrix that is invariant under all unitary operators of the form . That is, it is a bipartite quantum state  that satisfies

for all unitary operators U acting on d-dimensional Hilbert space. These states were first developed by Reinhard F. Werner in 1989.

General definition 
Every Werner state  is a mixture of projectors onto the symmetric and antisymmetric subspaces, with the relative weight  being the main parameter that defines the state, in addition to the dimension :

where 

are the projectors and 

is the permutation or flip operator that exchanges the two subsystems A and B.

Werner states are separable for p ≥  and entangled for p < . All entangled Werner states violate the PPT separability criterion, but for d ≥ 3 no Werner state violates the weaker reduction criterion. Werner states can be parametrized in different ways. One way of writing them is

where the new parameter α varies between −1 and 1 and relates to p as

Two-qubit example 

Werner-Holevo channels 

A Werner-Holevo quantum channel  with parameters  and integer 
is defined as

where the quantum channels  and
 are defined as

and  denotes the partial transpose map on system A. Note that the
Choi state of the Werner-Holevo channel 
is a Werner state:

where .

Multipartite Werner states 

Werner states can be generalized to the multipartite case. An N-party Werner state is a state that is invariant under  for any unitary U on a single subsystem. The Werner state is no longer described by a single parameter, but by N! − 1 parameters, and is a linear combination of the N! different permutations on N systems.

References 

Quantum mechanics